HaClique (AKA The Clique/HaClick/The Click/Haklik) (Hebrew: הקליק) is an Israeli rock and new wave band, founded in 1980 by Dani Dothan (lyrics and vocals), Eli Abramov (music, guitar and production) Oved Efrat (Bass) and Jean-Jacques Goldberg (drums).

The band started their activity in Tel Aviv in 1980.
They became well known in Israel for songs like "Incubator", "Golem", "Ani Avud", "Al Tadliku Li Ner" and "Kol Haemet". In all, they released three albums, a live album, a mini-album, a box-set and three singles.

History
In the beginning, Dani Dothan and Eli Abramov had joined Jean-Jacques Goldberg and Oved Efrat in an attempt to do something different from the mainstream music of the time. They came up with the band name one fateful day on a 3-day acid trip when reading a newspaper article humor and social stigmatism in European "cliques", calling themselves HaClique. The first two songs attributed to the band were by Dothan and Avramov: "One With Experience" and "Step Out to the World". These would later be released in 1995 on the compilation "קצת אחר 3".

In 1980, the four of them, along with guitarist Uzi Binder, recorded the songs "Tzaleket Ktana" and "Makom Belibech", which were released as a 7" record. The first few live shows were at cinema "Paris" in Tel Aviv.

 In 1981, their first record, Ima Ani Lo Rotze Lehigamel, was released. It included the songs "Yeled Mavchena", "Ima Ani Lo Rotze Lehigamel", "Golem" and "Incubator". These songs describe the test tube birth of a child up to his death. The record wasn't a great success but with about a thousand copies sold it made the charts in Israel.

In 1982, HaClique joined with Rami Fortis and Ronen Ben Tal of Chromosome and Jean Conflict. The purpose was to play at the connection festival in Eilat. Although this came to nothing, they continued to appear together at club "Linguini" in Tel Aviv for three months.

In 1983, their second album, Olam Tzafuf, was released which included the songs: "Kol Haemet", "Mondina", "Hey Yaldon", "Yalda Mefuneket", "Ani Avud", "Al Tadliku Li Ner" and "Bear Hug". This record mentioned relations between homosexuals, which had been unseen before in Israeli music. At the same time, a single from the album, "Al Tadliku Li Ner" was released, about the Lebanon War.

That same year, the band played mainly in Tel Aviv at the club, Dan Cinema but also appeared a few times in Jerusalem and Haifa. They found success but some members thought that they would not get the exposure they deserved without compromise. Due to this disagreement, HaClique went into hiatus for a while.

In 1988 the band reunited and recorded a live album, Live In Tel-Aviv, at 'Real Time', releasing it as a limited edition vinyl record. In 1995, Dani Dothan recorded a solo album All of the Forbidden Loves under the record label "The Third Ear". Ovad Efrat and Eli Avramov played on the record.

In 2002, the band released a box set containing their two previous studio albums Ima Ani Lo Rotze Lehigamel, Olam Tzafuf and a new album, Hakol Mushlam, including the songs: "Eretz Israel 2000" and "Hakol Mushlam". Three promo CD singles were also released to promote the box-set; "Incubator", "Al Tadliku Li Ner" and "Eretz Israel 2000".

In 2004 the band re-united for concerts at the "Barbie" in Tel Aviv with Jean-Jacques Goldberg and keyboardist Jasmin Even. 

On 28 December 2006, band member Jean-Jacques Goldberg died after a two-year struggle with cancer. 

In 2010 the band started to work on a new album and performed live concerts, with Oded Perach on drums.
They recorded new songs at Key Club studio in the U.S. and later mixed by Joav Shdema. 
The creative process was documented in a film, The Last Clique, by dalia Mevorach and Dani Dothan.
Their last, critically acclaimed album, Ani lo Bapaskol, on June 18th 2015 by Kamea records.
The cover was made by Lahav Halevy. 

Eli Abramov died  of cancer at 61 on 24 November 2015. This now leaves only two permanent surviving members of the group.

Members
Dani Dothan (Lead Vocals, Lyrics) (born 5 May 1954 in Jerusalem)
Eli Abramov (Guitar, Music) (born 25 July 1954 in Jerusalem – died on November 24th, 2015)
Ovad Efrat/'Obi Pepper' (Bass) (born 1 April 1956 in Jaffa, Tel Aviv); father of Daniel Efrat
Jean-Jacques Goldberg (Drums) (born 22 October 1955 in Belgium – died 28 December 2006 in Marseilles)
 
Other artists who collaborated with the Clique:
Oded Perach, drums 
Uzi Binder (Lead Guitar) (1979–1980) (born 24 July 1957)
Rona Vered (Keys/Synth) (1982–1983)
Jasmin Even (Keys) (2005–2006) (born 12 December 1978)
Joav Shdema, music engineer

Discography

Albums
Ima Ani Lo Rotze Lehigamel (1981)
Olam Tzafuf (1983)
Live In Tel-Aviv (1988)
Hakol Mushlam appeared only in the Box set (2002)
Hakufsa Box Set collecting and re-mastering their first two albums (2002)
Ani Lo BaPaskol LP, Kamea Records (2015)

Singles

CD Singles

Milim Zolot (Three Versions) (1998)
Incubator (Hakufsa promo CD single) (2002)
Al Tadliku Li Ner (Hakufsa promo CD single) (2002)
Eretz Israel 2000 (Hakufsa promo CD single) (2002)

References

External links
 http://mooma.mako.co.il/artist.asp?ArtistId=2775

Israeli rock music groups
Musical groups established in 1980
Post-punk music groups
Israeli new wave musical groups